Jonathan Sings! is the fourth album by American rock band Jonathan Richman and the Modern Lovers, released in 1983 by Sire Records.

Reception 
The album placed number 8 in The Village Voice'''s annual Pazz & Jop critics' poll of 1984.  NME'' also ranked it number 19 among the "Albums of the Year" for 1984.

Track listing
All songs written by Jonathan Richman.

Side one
"That Summer Feeling" – 3:56
"This Kind of Music" – 2:11
"The Neighbors" – 3:20
"Somebody to Hold Me" – 3:20
"Those Conga Drums" – 3:05

Side two
"Stop This Car" – 1:49
"Not Yet Three" – 2:42
"Give Paris One More Chance" – 2:55
"You're the One for Me" – 3:19
"When I'm Walking" – 3:03

1993 CD bonus track
"The Tag Game" – 4:30
Denoted as "previously released in the U.K. only"

Personnel
Jonathan Richman – vocals, guitar

The Modern Lovers
Ken Forfia – keyboards
Michael Guardabascio – drums
Beth Harrington – backing vocals
Greg Keranen – bass
Ellie Marshall – backing vocals

Technical
Peter Bernstein – producer
Josef Marc – additional production
Larry Hinds – engineer
Mark Linett – mixing
Joe McEwen – reissue co-producer
Jim Bessman – reissue co-producer, liner notes
Lee Herschberg – digital remastering
Molly Reeve-Morrison – project coordination
Billy Sullivan – cover painting
Jackie Sallow – back cover photograph
Jeri McManus – design
Tom Recchian – front cover lettering

References 

1983 albums
Jonathan Richman albums
Sire Records albums